Joel Rundell (September 26, 1965 – August 8, 1990) was an American musician best known as one of the four original members and lead guitarist of the Louisiana-based alternative rock band Better Than Ezra. He and the other original members formed the group while attending Louisiana State University.

Rundell died by suicide on August 8, 1990, nearly a year after the release of the band's first album, Surprise. After his death, the band went on hiatus before reuniting as a trio by the end of 1990.

In 2016, Rundell's family and former drummer Cary Bonnecaze sued the band. Citing the 25th anniversary edition of Surprise, a remastered version, the contention was that Better Than Ezra did not have the right to re-release the album.

Discography

with Better Than Ezra 

 Surprise (1990)

References

1965 births
1990 suicides
American rock guitarists
American male guitarists
Better Than Ezra members
Louisiana State University alumni
20th-century American musicians
20th-century American guitarists
20th-century American male musicians
Suicides in the United States